BD−22 5866 is a quadruple-star system located 166 light years from Earth. The four stars are each about half the mass of the Sun and are approximately 500 million years old. The system is unusual in how closely the four stars are orbiting each other; one pair has an orbital separation of at most .04 astronomical units and an orbital period of about two days, the other pair has a separation of at most .26 astronomical units and a period of about 55 days, and the two pairs are separated by 5.8 AU and have an orbital period of less than nine years.

Since current theories of star formation indicate that stars like these could not form in such close proximity to each other, a favored explanation is that there may have been a single gaseous disk that forced them into such small orbits within the first 100,000 years of their evolution. The two pairs are currently moving farther apart due to tidal interaction, indicating that they were once even more closely associated than today.

References

External links
 jumk.de
 Image BD-225866

Aquarius (constellation)
4
Durchmusterung objects
K-type main-sequence stars
M-type main-sequence stars
Spectroscopic binaries
Eclipsing binaries